Valmir Roseno Santos (born 2 August 1984), known as Bida, is a Brazilian footballer who plays as midfielder for Mixto.

Career statistics

References

External links
 

1984 births
Living people
Brazilian footballers
Association football midfielders
Campeonato Brasileiro Série A players
Campeonato Brasileiro Série B players
Esporte Clube Vitória players
Santos FC players
Atlético Clube Goianiense players
Associação Atlética Ponte Preta players
Vila Nova Futebol Clube players
ABC Futebol Clube players
Mixto Esporte Clube players